Salpura railway station is a railway station in Baran district, Rajasthan. Its code is SYL. It serves Salpura village. The station consists of a single platform. Passenger and Express trains halt here.

References

Railway stations in Baran district
Kota railway division